Slut in a Good Way is a Canadian black-and-white comedy film from Quebec written by Catherine Léger and directed by Sophie Lorain. It stars Marguerite Bouchard, Romane Denise, and Rose Adam as three teenage girls navigating their sexuality and rebelling against sexual double standards. The film premiered in Canada in March of 2018 and subsequently screened at the Tribeca Festival.

The film earned a positive reception from critics who applauded its sex-positive message and its novel approach to the coming-of-age and romantic comedy genres. Léger won a Canadian Screen Award for her script.

Synopsis
17-year-old Charlotte is reeling from a breakup with her boyfriend, who confessed to her he is gay right after she lost her virginity to him. One day, Charlotte and her friends Mégane and Aube wander into the big-box toy store Jouets Dépôt, and after discovering that several attractive guys work there, the girls apply for part-time jobs. On her first day at work, Charlotte is paired with the amiable Guillaume. On another day, she is tasked with shadowing the flirtatious Francis. To get over her ex, Charlotte reciprocates Francis's advances and sleeps with him. She subsequently engages in dalliances with other male co-workers, with the exception of Guillaume. 

Unbeknownst to Charlotte, the guys share their stories about hooking up with her, which gives her a reputation as a "slut." At a Halloween party, Charlotte and Guillaume grow closer, but just as they are about to kiss, Francis walks in on them and makes a casual comment to Charlotte congratulating her on reaching "a perfect score", meaning she has nearly hooked up with all of the guys at the store. A humiliated Charlotte suspects Guillaume of trying to sleep with her just so he can join the other guys. Guillaume insists this was not his intention and that he truly likes her, but Charlotte leaves and gives him the cold shoulder at work. 

Charlotte responds to the sexism by resolving to stay abstinent. When the guys participate in Movember, an annual fundraiser to raise awareness for men's health issues, such as prostate cancer, Mégane mocks them and says the only ones who stand to benefit from their fundraiser are the pharmaceutical companies that would profit from finding a cure for prostate cancer. She creates her own movement in response—a  Lysistrata-like campaign to withhold sex from the guys at work until Christmas. The other girls at the store, also put off by the double standards concerning male and female sexuality, join Charlotte and Mégane in the pledge and help raise funds for women's cancer research.

Meanwhile, Aube, the virgin of the trio, is attracted to co-worker Olivier, but he is oblivious to her interest. In an attempt to show solidarity with the other guys who want to end the girls' "sex strike", Olivier approaches Aube and accompanies her home one day. While watching a movie together, the two make out. When Charlotte learns Aube kissed Olivier, she accuses Aube of wanting to break the strike. In an argument in front of all of the other girls, Aube slut-shames Charlotte. The girls decide to call off the whole sex strike. Shortly before Christmas, Charlotte goes to visit Léa, a single mother and Jouets Dépôt manager who has recently given birth. Léa assures Charlotte that she should not be ashamed about her sexuality and not allow petty gossip to bring her down. Charlotte gifts the money raised from the abstinence pledge ($2,000 in total) to Léa and her new baby. 

Charlotte reconciles with Aube and Mégane, with Aube apologizing for calling Charlotte a “slut in a bad way” and Mégane apologizing to Aube for calling her a "virgin in a bad way.” The trio head to a Christmas party where Mégane makes a serious announcement that stops everyone in their tracks—Charlotte is pregnant and does not know who the father is. After saying she will keep the baby, Charlotte reveals she is just joking about a pregnancy. Many of the employees have coupled up—Aube with Olivier, Antoine with Émilie, and Francis with Mégane. Charlotte apologizes to Guillaume, who accepts her apology and says he is glad they can still be friends. Charlotte insists she wants to be more than friends, and after jokingly stringing her along, Guillaume kisses her. The film ends in a Bollywood-style holiday dance sequence.

Cast

Production 
Because of the film's subject matter concerning young women and sexuality, no Toys "R" Us stores allowed filming at their locations. Production built a set in an empty lot for the Jouets Dépôt store. 

Lorain chose to shoot the film in black-and-white not only to give the film a "timeless" look, but to ensure that the lead characters would not be drowned out by the colorful setting of the toy store.

Release 
The film had its world premiere in Canada on March 2, 2018. In the United States, the film premiered on April 21, 2018 at the Tribeca Festival. Comedy Dynamics picked up the film for theatrical distribution and it received a limited release on March 29, 2019.

Reception 
On review aggregate website, Slut in a Good Way has an approval rating of 100% based on 21 reviews. On Metacritic, the film has a score of 74 based on 9 reviews, indicating a "generally favorable" reception.

Critics praised the film for its unapologetic look at female adolescent sexuality. Peter Debruge of Variety called it a "hilarious twist on the traditionally male-driven teen sex comedy, wherein immature young men spend considerable effort trying to convince someone to sleep with them", and wrote "this tiny Canadian crowd-pleaser argues there's nothing wrong if girls just want to have fun too." Writing in The New York Times, Teo Bugbee said, "In satisfying fashion, Slut in a Good Way recognizes the potential for cruelty that exists as teenagers experiment and learn through sex, but its portrait of adolescence never feels less than loving." Leah Greenblatt of Entertainment Weekly gave the film a grade of B+, writing "even if Lorain’s tidy ending is more than a little idealized, Slut is far more gratifying and empowering than most of the material Hollywood’s Lolita Industrial Complex turns out when it comes to young women’s sexuality. Whatever the title says, it’s not about good or bad; it’s about every girl’s right to choose her own labels, or none at all. Monica Castillo of RogerEbert.com wrote, "The film’s sharp critique of double standards never feels like sermonizing, the teenagers’ observations about their situations feel organic, like stray musings traded over smuggled booze in the park." Castillo said the black-and-white cinematography gives the film a "modern yet romantic" feel, and also praised the lead actors, writing "Bouchard, Adam and Denis’s naturalistic performances bring these lively characters off the page in a way that’s effortlessly charming."

Accolades

References

External links
 
 

2018 films
2018 comedy films
2010s feminist films
2010s female buddy films
2010s romantic comedy films
2010s coming-of-age comedy films
2010s teen comedy films
Canadian black-and-white films
Canadian coming-of-age comedy films
Canadian comedy films
Canadian sex comedy films
Films about virginity
Juvenile sexuality in films
Films set in department stores
Films set in Quebec
French-language Canadian films
2010s Canadian films